Whetstone may refer to:

Tools and technology
 Whetstone, a sharpening stone used for knives and other cutting tools
 Hornfels, a type of stone sometimes called whetstone
 Whetstone (benchmark), a benchmark for measuring computing power
 Operation Whetstone, a nuclear test program in the 1960s

Places 
United Kingdom
 Whetstone, Leicestershire, a village and civil parish
 Whetstone, London
 Whetstones (stone circle), an ancient pagan monument in Powys, Wales

United States
 Whetstone, Arizona, a census-designated place
 Whetstone, West Virginia, an unincorporated community
 The Whetstone River in South Dakota and Minnesota
 Whetstone Gulf State Park in New York
 Whetstone High School (Columbus, Ohio), a high school located in the Clintonville neighborhood of Columbus, Ohio
 Whetstone Mountain in Colorado
 Whetstone Mountains in Arizona

Other uses
 Whetstone (surname)

See also
 Wheatstone (disambiguation)